Descartes Island is a rocky island  long, midway between Lagrange Island and La Conchee and  north-northeast of Cape Mousse. It was charted in 1951 by the French Antarctic Expedition and named after René Descartes, the French mathematician and philosopher.

See also 
 List of Antarctic and sub-Antarctic islands

References

René Descartes
Islands of Adélie Land